John Durnan (born 11 July 1957) is a former Australian rules footballer who played for Geelong and St Kilda in the Victorian Football League (VFL).

References

External links
 
 

1957 births
Living people
Geelong Football Club players
St Kilda Football Club players
Australian rules footballers from New South Wales
People educated at Geelong College